Final results for the water polo tournament at the 1952 Summer Olympics.

Medal summary

Team squads
For the team rosters see: Water polo at the 1952 Summer Olympics – Men's team squads.

Results

Eliminating rounds
In order to reduce the field from 21 teams to 16 for the round-robin pools, two eliminating rounds were used. The teams were drawn into 10 pairs, with one team (Argentina) drawing a bye through the eliminating rounds. The 10 winners of the first eliminating round advanced to the round robins, while the 10 losers were paired again for a second eliminating round. Again the winners advanced to the round robins; the 5 losers of this second eliminating round, however, were eliminated from competition.

First eliminating round

Second eliminating round

First round

The first round consisted of the remaining 16 teams divided into 4 pools of 4 teams each. Each pool played a round robin. For wins, 2 standings points were awarded; draws were worth 1 and losses 0. The top two teams in each pool advanced.

Group A

Group B

Group C
The first match between the Netherlands and Yugoslavia was won by the Dutch, 3–2, but successfully protested by Yugoslavia on the grounds that the "referee in this match had shown incompetency." FINA invalidated the match and ordered a replay. Because the results of the match were not necessary to determine qualification for the semifinals (both teams would advance regardless), and because the two teams were drawn into the same semifinal group, the replay was not held until the semifinal round though Yugoslavia's 2–1 win ultimately counted in the standings for the first round group.

Group D

Semifinals
The 8 semifinalist teams were again divided into pools of 4 teams each. Each pool played a round robin, with the results of the first round games between teams from the same first round pool counting for the semifinals as well. For wins, 2 standings points were awarded; draws were worth 1 and losses 0. The top two teams in each pool advanced to the final; the bottom 2 teams moved to the 5th–8th place classification round.

Semifinal E
The results of the first round Italy–United States and Belgium–Spain matches counted for the semifinal pool.

Semifinal F
The results of the first round match between Hungary and the Soviet Union were counted as part of the semifinal round robin. The first-round match between the Netherlands and Yugoslavia had been invalidated due to a successful protest. The replay of that match took place at the end of the semifinal pool and was effectively an elimination match: the winner would join Hungary in advancing to the final, with the loser moving to the classification round. The Netherlands would advance if the match were drawn. In the replay, Yugoslavia took a 2–1 decision to advance and eliminate the Netherlands.

Finals

The 4 finalists played one more round robin. For wins, 2 standings points were awarded; draws were worth 1 and losses 0. There was also a classification pool for the semifinal losers.

Final
The first round game between Italy and the United States and the semifinal match between Yugoslavia and Hungary counted for the final pool.

Classification round 5–8
The first round match between Belgium and Spain and the semifinal match between the Netherlands and the Soviet Union counted for the classification pool.

Final standings

References

Sources
 PDF documents in the LA84 Foundation Digital Library:
 Official Report of the 1952 Olympic Games (download, archive) (pp. 600–608)
 Water polo on the Olympedia website
 Water polo at the 1952 Summer Olympics (men's tournament)
 Water polo on the Sports Reference website
 Water polo at the 1952 Summer Games (men's tournament) (archived)

External links
 International Olympic Committee medal database

 
1952 Summer Olympics events
1952
1952 in water polo